Aamne Samne may refer to:

 Aamne Samne (1967 film)
 Aamne Samne (1982 film)